Reinhard Kuretzky (born 1 December 1947) is a German former pole vaulter who competed in the 1972 Summer Olympics.

References

1947 births
Living people
German male pole vaulters
Olympic athletes of West Germany
Athletes (track and field) at the 1972 Summer Olympics